Asad Muhammad Saeed as-Sagharji (أسعد محمد سعيد الصاغرجي) was a Syrian Islamic scholar specializing in the field of Hanafi Fiqh, who lived in Damascus, Syria. He was the head Imam of Jamia al-Umawi in Damascus, and was the leading Faqih (jurist) in Syria. As-Sagharji belonged to the Shadhili Sufi order. He is the author of several books. One of the Shaykh’s most prominent teachers was the distinguished Syrian scholar, Al-Shaykh al-Sayyid Ibrahīm al-Ya’qūbī.

Works
The Shaykh was a prolific author and produced a number of notable works,

His al-Fiqh al-Hanafiyyah wa Adillatahu is a comprehensive manual in three volumes on the key evidence from the Qur'an and Sunnah proving the Hanafi Fiqh. Along with the Shaykh’s other works such as Shu’ab al-īmān, Sayyidunā Muhammad Rasūlallāh, Zawjatun-Nabī and Hajj wal-‘Umra,the book is studied in many Arab universities, including the renowned Al-Azhar University in Cairo.

Death
He died on 21 August 2015 and was buried in Madina Jannatul Baqi cemetery.

References

External links
Muslimyouth.org.uk
Interview at Yanabi.com

Islam in Syria
Hanafi fiqh scholars